Severe Tropical Storm Zelda was the last tropical cyclone of the 1991 Pacific typhoon season; it struck the Marshall Islands on November 28. The area of low pressure that eventually became Zelda formed near the International Date Line, and strengthened into a tropical depression on November 27. The Joint Typhoon Warning Center (JTWC) reported that the depression had reached tropical storm intensity near the Marshall Islands on November 28, thus naming it Zelda. On November 29, the storm quickly strengthened to  according to the JTWC, equivalent to a Category 1 typhoon on the Saffir–Simpson hurricane wind scale. Zelda weakened into a tropical storm on December 2, and then a tropical depression two days later. The JTWC discontinued warnings late on December 4, while the JMA declared the storm to be extratropical the next day and continued to track until it crossed the International Date Line again on December 7.

Zelda caused significant damage in the Marshall Islands, and operations at Kwajalein Missile Range were disrupted severely.  No deaths or injuries were reported. About 60 percent of homes were destroyed in Ebeye Island, leaving 6,000 people without residence.  Nearly all crops on the islands were destroyed, and food and other supplies were contaminated by salt.  Later in December, the president of the United States, George H. W. Bush declared the storm to be a major disaster, allowing the Federal Emergency Management Agency (FEMA) to assist with funding and repairs.  The Marshall Islands also requested funds from other countries.

Meteorological history

Westerly winds near the equator – associated with an ongoing El Niño event – assisted in spawning a weak area of low pressure in late November 1991 near the International Date Line. The JTWC began tracking the area on the Significant Tropical Weather Advisory at 06:00 UTC on November 25. Vertical wind shear prevented strengthening at first, but the disturbance continued to develop. A tropical cyclone formation alert from the Joint Typhoon Warning Center (JTWC) soon followed. The Japan Meteorological Agency (JMA) started tracking the disturbance at 06:00 UTC on November 27, and the JTWC issued their first warning 18 hours later on the depression, naming it 31W. Operationally, the storm was upgraded twenty-four hours later and given the name Zelda, after Kwajalein received stronger winds than expected. The JTWC attributed the delay to the small size of the storm, the poorly organized outflow, and the lack of visible and infrared image pairs for analysis. The JMA upgraded the storm at 03:00 UTC on November 29, then to a severe tropical storm eighteen hours later.

Later, a trough created by Typhoon Yuri caused the subtropical ridge to weaken, allowing Zelda to move northward. By December 1, the storm began to weaken and turned northeast. Upper-level winds and westerlies soon increased, and Zelda's central convection became sheared. The JMA downgraded Zelda to a tropical storm on December 3, and to a tropical depression later that day. A few hours later, the JTWC downgraded the storm to a tropical depression, as it unexpectedly turned to the northwest. The low-level circulation of the storm detached from the cold front, and the JTWC issued the last warning of the year. The depression turned back northeast, the JMA declared the storm to be extratropical on December 5, and the agency stopped tracking it just past the International Date Line on December 7. Remnants of the storm moved inland into northern British Columbia by December 8.

Impact and aftermath
Zelda was the first of three storms to strike the Marshall Islands within one year, just before Axel and Gay in 1992. The storm impacted islands of Kwajalein, Majuro, Lae, Wotho, and Eniwetok. Kwajalein Missile Range, which was used in Strategic Defense Initiative testing, caught stronger winds than expected from the storm, affecting operations at the missile range. On Ebeye Island, 60 percent of homes made of plywood and sheet-iron roofs were destroyed by the storm, and 6,000 people were left homeless. Food and water supplies were contaminated from salt in storm surge, and the water desalination plant became inoperable. Power lines were cut across the island. There were no deaths or significant injuries. Other islands in the nation had their water contaminated by saltwater, and 95 percent of the crops were destroyed by the storm surge. Coral reefs were also heavily damaged when the storm came nearby. As an extratropical cyclone, Zelda bought heavy rain and  winds to Southeast Alaska. Heavy snow was reported in northern British Columbia, and lesser amounts inland British Columbia and southern Yukon.

The United States Army engaged in clean up and repairing in the country. On December 6, the 834th Airlift Division sent six C-130s to Kwajalein with supplies. On the same day, President of the United States George H. W. Bush, through the Compact of Free Association, declared a major disaster in the Marshall Islands, allowing federal funding to be sent to the Arno, Aur, Kwajalein, Lae, Lib, Namu and Ujae islands. United States Senator Daniel Akaka visited Ebeye after the storm, and he criticized the response of the Federal Emergency Management Agency (FEMA), as the funding did not cover repairing of structures regarded as substandard. The Government of the Marshall Islands requested for aid via United Nations Disaster Relief Organization (UNDRO) on December 18. By December 19, 1,380 people were still living in temporary shelters.

By March 26, 1992, about $98,000 (1992 USD) worth of relief goods were sent to the Marshall Islands from UNDRO, United Nations Development Programme (UNDP), and Government of Australia. FEMA sent $1.518 million (1992 USD) to affected families. Critical infrastructure in Ebeye were repaired by the Kwajalein Atoll Development Authority by November 1992.

See also

Other tropical cyclones named Zelda

Notes

References

External links
 Digital Typhoon: Typhoon 199129 (ZELDA)
 Pictures of damage in Kwajalein

1991 Pacific typhoon season
Western Pacific severe tropical storms
Typhoons in the Marshall Islands
Tropical cyclones in Alaska